BoltBus was an intercity bus common carrier and a division of Greyhound Lines that operated from March 2008 until July 2021 in the northeast and western United States and British Columbia, Canada.

As least one ticket on every bus was randomly sold for $1, excluding "handling charges". The $1 fare was the basis for its slogan "Bolt for a Buck".

In the northeast, BoltBus provided service between New York City and South Station Bus Terminal in Boston, Union Station in Washington, D.C., Penn Station, in Baltimore, the Greenbelt Metro station in Greenbelt, Maryland, Penn Station in Newark, 30th Street Station in Philadelphia, and the Cherry Hill Mall in Cherry Hill, New Jersey. On the west coast, BoltBus service was offered in Oregon, Washington, and British Columbia, Canada. Service was available between International District/Chinatown station in Seattle and Portland, Pacific Central Station in Vancouver, Bellingham, Albany, and Eugene.

The BoltBus branding incorporated a thunderbolt logo similar to the one used by the British Union of Fascists, but the company claimed that the resemblance was purely coincidental.

When ticketed, passengers were assigned to a boarding group (S, A, B & C). Passengers who purchased their tickets earlier or were members of the company's loyalty program or had special needs got an earlier boarding group assignment.

History

In March 2008, facing competition from Chinatown bus lines in the northeast, Greyhound and Peter Pan Bus Lines partnered to launch BoltBus as a lower-cost brand.

The first route was between New York City and Washington, D.C., launched on March 27, 2008, followed by a route between New York City and Philadelphia launched on April 10, 2008, and between New York City and Boston launched on April 24, 2008.

That year, the company was named one of America's hottest brands by Ad Age.

Stops in Baltimore and Greenbelt, Maryland were added in 2009.

A stop in Newark, New Jersey was added on March 24, 2011.

BoltBus expanded to the Pacific Northwest on May 17, 2012, offering service between Seattle and Portland. Unlike the service in the northeast, Greyhound operated its BoltBus service on the west coast without a partner bus carrier. Service in the Pacific Northwest was expanded to Vancouver and Bellingham on May 31, 2012 and to Albany and Eugene on October 3, 2013.

BoltBus expanded into California on October 31, 2013, offering service between Los Angeles and San Jose and Oakland. A stop at Transbay Terminal in San Francisco was added to the route on December 12, 2013.

A second route between Union Station in Los Angeles and San Diego was added on November 14, 2013.

On December 12, 2013, a route was added between Los Angeles Union Station and Las Vegas, with a stop in Barstow.

In 2015, it added a pickup in Hollywood, Los Angeles for routes to/from Northern California.

In October 2016, the company launched a new onboard entertainment system.

Effective September 27, 2017, after a lengthy legal skirmish, Greyhound and Peter Pan Bus Lines ended their partnership and Greyhound became the sole owner of BoltBus.

On October 19, 2017, BoltBus service was extended to Fresno, California, with routes to Los Angeles, Hollywood, San Jose, San Francisco, and Oakland.

In March 2019, BoltBus added stops in Tacoma, Washington and Everett, Washington. It also added a stop in Wilmington, Delaware.

On July 1, 2021, BoltBus discontinued its operations.

In September 2021, FlixMobility acquired Greyhound.

Fleet

BoltBus routes used Prevost X3-45 and MCI D4505 coaches. All motorcoaches were equipped with wireless internet access and seats that had armrests, footrests, seat belts, cup holders. Most seats had a pair of 120-volt power outlets. The motorcoaches used on BoltBus had 5 fewer seats than the industry standard, giving passengers additional legroom and eliminating the middle seat from the last row.

References

Further reading
 Bowen, Alison, "Boltbus, Megabus and Fung-Wah: Curbside buses more dangerous: Buses that pick up passengers off the street are more dangerous than those that use a terminal, a new report found", Metro newspaper, New York City, October 31, 2011

External links

2008 introductions
Bus transportation in New Jersey
Bus transportation in Oregon
Bus transportation in Washington (state)
Greyhound Lines
Intercity bus companies of the United States
Products and services discontinued in 2021